James T. Phillips, Jr. (died April 22, 1980) was a Liberian politician. Phillips served as Secretary for Agriculture and Commerce in the national government 1968-1971. Following the split of the government ministerial portfolio into two with the arrival of William R. Tolbert, Jr. to the Presidency, Phillips served as Minister of Agriculture between 1971 and 1976. He then served as Minister of Finance between 1976 and 1979.

Philipps was one of the more reform-oriented ministers in the Tolbert government. He was fired from his ministerial post over a controversy on disappeared funds allocated to a floating intended to be used for the 1979 Organization of African Unity summit. Shortly thereafter, in the wake of the military coup that brought down the Tolbert government, Phillips and 12 other officials of the former government were executed by soldiers at the beach behind the Barclay Training Center on April 22, 1980.

References

1980 deaths
Finance Ministers of Liberia
People executed by Liberia by firing squad
20th-century Liberian politicians